"Bad Love" is a song recorded by American country music artist Pake McEntire.  It was released in October 1986 as the third single from the album Too Old to Grow Up Now.  The song reached #12 on the Billboard Hot Country Singles & Tracks chart.  The song was written by Dennis Linde.

Chart performance

References

1986 singles
1986 songs
Pake McEntire songs
Songs written by Dennis Linde
Song recordings produced by Mark Wright (record producer)
RCA Records singles